Tahir Bilgiç (born 12 December 1968) is an Australian comedian, film and television actor, of Turkish descent. He is primarily an actor and comedian. He has written, directed and starred in some of the most successful live stage shows Australia has ever seen, including "Lord of The Kebabs", "From Lebanon With Love" and "Straight Outta Compo" to name a few.  He has appeared in 5 different Australian sit-coms and 3 feature films.  He co-created and starred in "StreetSmart" (ch10) as well as coming with the initial idea and then co-creating "Here Come The Habibs" (ch9).

Career
Tahir has a huge body of work and is enjoying a highly successful career as a comedian / writer / director and actor.  

He features as the Lebanese character Habib in the hit series Pizza and the motion pictures Fat Pizza and Fat Pizza vs. Housos. Habib became of Australia's most popular and loved tv- sitcom characters. In 2011, he appeared in Swift and Shift Couriers.

Bilgiç has appeared on Rove Live, The NRL Footy Show, Laughing Stock, Recovery, Foxtel, Comedy Channel, the SBS documentary series - Aussie Jokers and the Australian improvisational comedy series, Thank God You're Here and as a celebrity judge on Bogan Hunters.

Filmography
 Sydney Comedy Store (1995)
 Voted Comedian of the Year (1996)
 The NRL Footy Show (1997 - 2018) Most appearances by a Comedian
 Pizza TV series (2000–2007)
 Fat Pizza (2003)
 Lord of the Kebabs: The Fellowship of the Hommous (2003)
 Show us your Roots (2004)
 Hollywood Kebabs (2004)
 Thank God You're Here" (2006-7)
 Swift and Shift Couriers (2011)
 Housos (2011)
 Bogan Hunters (2014)
 Fat Pizza vs. Housos (2014)
 The Good The Bad The Ethnic (2015)
 Comicus Erectus (2016)
 2 and a Half Lebs (2017)
 Here Come the Habibs (2016)
 Straight Outta Compo (2019)
 Street Smart (2018)
 I'm a Celebrity...Get Me Out of Here! (2018)
 Crazy Rich Ethnics (2021 - 22)

References

External links
 "Tahir Online" Tahir Bilgiç Official Website

Living people
Turkish male film actors
Turkish emigrants to Australia
Australian stand-up comedians
Male actors from Sydney
Australian male comedians
I'm a Celebrity...Get Me Out of Here! (Australian TV series) participants
1970 births